Dounan may refer to:

 Dounan, Chenggong District, Kunming, China; location of Dounan Flower Market 
 Dounan, Yunlin, transport centre for Yunlin County, Taiwan
 Dounan Station, Yunlin County, Taiwan